Kala Keerthi Madurawela Arachchilage Christy Leonard Perera (born 27 July 1932 – died 23 December 2015 as ක්‍රිස්ටි ලෙනාඩ් පෙරේරා) [Sinhala]), popularly as Christy Leonard Perera, was an actor in Sri Lankan cinema as well as a musician and comedian.

Personal life
Perera was born on 27 July 1932 in Colombo. He completed education from St. Lucia's College Colombo 13 . His father worked as a port checker. He has two sisters. After the sudden death of father, his mother worked as a midwife at Suleiman Hospital. In the meantime, his older sister died suddenly. The other sister also died with that sadness.

He was married to Mary Loretta Rachal Perera, a trained teacher. Perera got married Rachel at St. Lucia Cathedral in Kotahena on 7 August 1982 at the age of 43. At that time, Perera was working at the Polythene Factory in Kotahena.

He was a devoted Roman Catholic and regularly attached with St. Lucias Catherdral, Kotahena. He died on 23 December 2015 at the age of 83. His remains were brought to his residence at Maligawatte housing scheme. His final rites was held on 26 July 2015 at Borella Cemetery.

Cinema career
In 1946 he participated amateur program at Radio Ceylon coordinated by Thevis Guruge. He imitated comedian Eddie Jayamanne and finally won the contest. In 1948, Perera joined as a comedian in Radio Ceylon. Perera learned music under renowned composer B. S. Perera. Then he worked as a musician and playback singer. His first song was Kullen Pola Pola. Some of her popular songs are, Mama Badapissa, Amma Kiyana Kiyatha Haki andAduru Walawe Punsada were recorded for HMV labels. He sang the duet Hitha Yana Atha Yannata Heka with Gamini Fonseka and then sang the song Tikiri Lande Ali Nawathina Colomba Nagare with H. R. Jothipala. His song Sakala Sirin Piri Siri Lankawe was an integral part of music shows back then.

His classmate Prem Jayanth was the main actor in the film Sujatha. With the guidance from Jayanth and fellow actor Dommie Jayawardena, Perera entered cinema. He started cinema career in 1954 with the film Warada Kageda directed by T.R. Sundaram. The film was released at Gamini theatre, Colombo and became highly popular. Then he acted in the film Adata Vediya Heta Hondai produced at Hendala Wijeya studio, Sri Lanka's first production house. He continuously established as a prominent comedian of early 1960s and played popular roles in the films Chandiya, Sukumali, Suneetha, Sundara Birinda, Allapu Gedara and Hondama Welawa. His only television acting came through Athma Pooja directed by Ajith Perera. But the teledrama was not aired.

His last film was Onna Mame Kella Panapi premiered on September 3, 1976. He quit from acting after the death of his mother in 1979. The song Amma Kiya Kiyatha Haki Ekama Landakatai was written by Karunaratne Abeysekera for Perera's mother. In 1994, he directed the film Aragalaya.

On 17 August 2002 Perera was honored with a festive ceremony.

Filmography

References

External links
 Yesteryear artistes to be felicitated
 කලාශිල්පී ක්‍රිස්ටි ලෙනාඩ්ගේ අවසන් කටයුතු
 වරෙක සිංහළ සිනමාවේ විකට රජා ගායක ක්‍රිස්ටි ලෙනාඩ් ජිවිත සිනමාවෙන් සමුගනී

1932 births
2015 deaths
Sri Lankan male film actors
Sri Lankan Roman Catholics
Sinhalese male actors